Home Sweet Home is a 1945 British musical comedy film directed by John E. Blakeley written by Roney Parsons and Anthony Toner and starring Frank Randle, Nicolette Roeg (sister of director Nicolas Roeg) and Tony Pendrell. Set in the fictitious town of Redvale, the film is largely a vehicle for slapstick routines by Randle.

Plot
Spirited orphan Jacqueline Chantry (Nicolette Roeg) is the chauffeuse to wealthy colonel Wright (H.F. Maltby) and his family. Son Eric Wright (Tony Pendrell) and Jacqueline fall in love and plan to marry, but the class conscious colonel's wife (Hilda Bayley) refuses to give her blessing. Saddened, Jacqueline packs her bags and leaves; eventually becoming a nightclub singer. Eric chases after her, but she's already found Frank (Frank Randle), a likeable chap who discovers that Jacqueline is in reality a wealthy heiress.

Cast
 Nicolette Roeg as Jacqueline Chantry
 Frank Randle as Frank
 Tony Pendrell as Eric Wright
 H. F. Maltby as Colonel Wright
 Hilda Bayley as Mrs. Wright
 Cecil Fredericks as Webster
 Stan Little as Young Herbert
 Bunty Meadows as Bunty
 Gerhard Kempinski as Pagoli
 George Merritt as Dr. Handy
 Howard Douglas as Martin, the butler
 Iris Vandeleur as Mrs. Jones
 Esma Lewis as Mrs. Luck
 Vincent Holman as The Parson
 Lily Lapidus as Welfare Worker
 Ben Williams as Reporter
 Max Melford as Policeman

Critical reception
Sky Movies gave it two out of five stars, concluding the film was "Only mild entertainment even when it was made and rather dated now"; while the Radio Times also rated the film two out of five stars, writing, "(Randle's) slack-jawed clowning provides the only real interest in this backstage Cinderella story...The songs are best forgotten, but there's a chance to see some of the most popular stage acts of the day". The reviewer for TV Guide wrote: "It passes the time, but it's not especially memorable."

References

Bibliography
 Gillett, Phillip. The British working class in postwar film. Manchester University Press, 2003.

External links

1945 films
British musical comedy films
1945 musical comedy films
Films directed by John E. Blakeley
Butcher's Film Service films
British black-and-white films
Films scored by Percival Mackey
Films shot in Greater Manchester
1940s English-language films
1940s British films